Both Ends Meet is a 1972 British TV sitcom for London Weekend Television set around women workers in a sausage factory. It featured veteran actress Dora Bryan as Dora Page a working class widow raising her son alone. The first series of seven episodes went to air as Both Ends Meet, but the second series was titled simply Dora.

The supporting cast included Deddie Davies and newcomer Wendy Richard

Series cast
Dora Bryan, as Dora Page
Ivor Dean, as factory owner Julius Cannon
Wendy Richard, as Maudie
Pat Ashton, as Glad
Deddie Davies, as Flo
Timothy Bateson, George Rogers
Fanny Carby Hilda Rogers
Meadows White, Mr. Page  
Paddy Ward, Fred 
Joan Benham,  Mrs. Templeton-Smythe  
John Lyons Harry
David Howe, Ronnie
Patricia Hamilton, Miss Cornelius (guest appearances by the British actress, in real life wife of lead actor Ivor Dean)

Episodes
Firm Foundations
Random Sample
The Lamp Still Burns
Party Piece
The Spring Collection
Come Fly with Me
Fancy Meeting You Here
Conversation Piece - Series 2 "Dora" Episode 1
Dear Little Agatha Jane
Dinner at Eight
Get Me to the Pub on Time
A Man About the House
The Jet Setters

References

1972 British television series debuts
ITV sitcoms